The Samajtantrik Sramik Front (SSF) (Socialist Workers Front) is a national trade union federation in Bangladesh. It is affiliated with the World Federation of Trade Unions.

References

Trade unions in Bangladesh
World Federation of Trade Unions
National federations of trade unions
Labour relations in Bangladesh